João Carlos Jordão (born 23 June 1962) is a Brazilian sailor. He competed in the Tornado event at the 2004 Summer Olympics.

References

External links
 

1962 births
Living people
Brazilian male sailors (sport)
Olympic sailors of Brazil
Sailors at the 2004 Summer Olympics – Tornado
Sportspeople from Niterói